Surfing at the 2008 Asian Beach Games was held from 19 October to 23 October 2008 in Bali, Indonesia.

Medalists

Medal table

Results

Men's shortboard

19 October

Qualifying round 1

Qualifying round 2

Repechage 1

Repechage 2

Qualifying round 3

Repechage 3

Repechage 4

Qualifying semifinal

Repechage 5

Repechage semifinal

Grand final

Men's longboard
20 October

Qualifying round 1

Qualifying round 2

Repechage 1

Repechage 2

Qualifying round 3

Repechage 3

Repechage semifinal

Grand final

Men's aerial
22 October

Qualifying round

Semifinal

Final

Women's shortboard
21 October

Qualifying round 1

Qualifying round 2

Repechage 1

Repechage 2

Qualifying round 3

Repechage 3

Repechage semifinal

Grand final

Mixed team
23 October

References
 Official site

2008 Asian Beach Games events
Asian Beach Games
Asian Beach Games
Surfing in Indonesia